Elsa Granger (died 8 February 1955) was an Australian actress who studied acting with P. J. Ramster and appeared in several of his films. She was a member of Sydney society and frequently appeared in the society columns. She travelled to Hollywood in 1922 but did not have much success.

Filmography
High Heels (1918)
Mated in the Wilds (1921)
Jasamine Freckel's Love Affair (1921)
A Rough Passage (1922)

References

External links

Year of birth missing
1955 deaths
Australian film actresses